Sabiha Shaikh  (born 3 November 1979), known professionally as Rani Chatterjee, is an Indian actress who predominantly works in Bhojpuri-language films. She is known for her roles in films like Sasura Bada Paisawala, Sita, Devra Bada Satawela and Rani No. 786. She also worked in the 2020 webseries Mastram.

Early life
Chatterjee was born as Sabiha Shaikh in a Muslim family on 3 November 1979. She was born and brought up in Mumbai. Chatterjee did her schooling from  Tungareshwar Academy High school, Vasai. Rani, who is originally Sabiha Shaikh on her documents, shares an interesting reason behind it. Talking to a section of media recently Rani said, "In 2004 I was shooting for a Bhojpuri film titled Sasura Bada Paisawala and one day we were shooting a sequence in a temple where I have to bang my head on the floor. And while the shoot was on a few media people had come to interview me also there was a lot of crowd was also watching the shoot. So my director thought revealing my original name might create a scene as I am a Muslim. So when someone people asked my name he said Rani and when they asked about my surname so he couldn't think of anything and said Chatterjee as Rani Mukerji was very famous at that point of time. And she also became famous with this name".

Rani also adds, "My family was definitely angry on me for keeping that name as my identity but she convinced them as she really found that name lucky. Manoj Tiwari was opposite me in the film and it became a huge hit on box office. In fact, made many records. Due to which I was offered a lot of work and I became the highest-paid actress in Bhojpuri industry".

Career
Chatterjee made her film debut in the 2003 Bhojpuri family drama Sasura Bada Paisawala featuring Manoj Tiwari. The film released in 2004 and was a success and won several awards. She followed it up with major hits like Bandhan Tute Na (2005), Damaad Ji (2006) and Munna Pandey Berozgar (2007). She earned a lot of critical acclaim for her titular role in Munnibai Nautanki Wali (2009). She won her first Best Actress Award for Devra Bada Satawela (2010).

The sixth Bhojpuri Awards in 2013 declared Chatterjee as the Best Actress of the year for her performance in Nagin. Rani has acted in a Punjabi film Aasra. In 2020, Chatterjee acted in MX player web series Mastram. She later acted in Kooku App web series Rani Ka Raja.

Selected filmography

Television

References

External links

1989 births
Living people
Actresses from Mumbai
Indian film actresses
Indian television actresses
Indian web series actresses
Actresses in Bhojpuri cinema
Actresses in Hindi television
Fear Factor: Khatron Ke Khiladi participants
21st-century Indian actresses